The discography of Tyler James, a British singer-songwriter, consists of two studio album, and five singles. After guesting on the underground R&B track "Wilder" by Stargate in 2001, which became a nightclub favourite in London, James got his first taste of celebrity. In 2002, after touring around the UK's bars, pubs and clubs; evolving his sound and performance, James had garnered enough reputation to be hailed as "The British answer to Justin Timberlake" by The Face magazine, whilst NME hailed him as "one to watch".

Tyler James was signed to Island Records in 2003 after they heard a demo tape featuring his future debut single, "Why Do I Do?". The reggae flavoured song made the 'A' playlist on BBC Radio 2, and entered the UK Singles Chart at number 25. In early 2005, James toured with Natasha Bedingfield and in the spring of 2005, his second single "Foolish" was released, which reached number 16 on the UK Singles Chart. July 2005, James' third single was released. Originally a number 1 hit for White Town, James covered "Your Woman". "Your Woman" reached number 60, whilst his album The Unlikely Lad was released as a digital download in August 2005. The album includes three songs co-written with Amy Winehouse, who also features on the track "Best for Me". 

The singer-songwriter returned in 2012, when he appeared as a contestant on the first series of The Voice UK—finishing as the series' runner-up behind Leanne Mitchell. It was confirmed in July 2012 that James had signed a new joint record deal with Island Records and Universal Music Group and had begun work on his second studio album. James then announced in August that the album's lead single, "Single Tear", would be released in the United Kingdom on 7 October, with the album A Place I Go following on 29 October. In February 2013 he released "Worry About You" as the second single from A Place I Go, the song features vocals from Kano.

Albums

Studio albums

Singles

As lead artist

As featured artist

Other charted songs

Guest appearances

References

Discographies of British artists